Sri Subrahmanyeshwara Higher Secondary School Katukukke (SSHSS Katukke) is located in Katukukke village in Enmakaje Panchayat, Kerala, India. About 5 km North of Perla town.

Languages
This locality is an essentially multi-lingual region. The people speak Malayalam, Kannada, Tulu, Beary bashe and Konkani. Migrant workers also speak Hindi and Tamil languages.

Administration
This village is part of Manjeswara assembly constituency which is again part of Kasaragod (Lok Sabha constituency).

References

External links

High schools and secondary schools in Kerala
Schools in Kasaragod district
Manjeshwar area